The Bishop of North Queensland is the diocesan bishop of the Anglican Diocese of North Queensland, Australia.

The seat of the bishop is at St James's Cathedral, Townsville, Queensland.{| class="wikitable"
|-
! colspan="5" style="background-color: #7F1734; color: white;" | Bishops of North Queensland
|-
! style="background-color: #D4B1BB; width: 5%;"  | No
! style="background-color: #D4B1BB; width: 10%;" | From
! style="background-color: #D4B1BB; width: 10%;" | Until
! style="background-color: #D4B1BB; width: 25%;" | Incumbent
! style="background-color: #D4B1BB; width: 50%;" | Notes

|- valign="top" style="background-color: #F7F0F2;"
| style="text-align: center;" | 
| style="text-align: center;" | 1878
| style="text-align: center;" | 1891
|  George Stanton
|
|- valign="top" style="background-color: white;"
| style="text-align: center;" | 
| style="text-align: center;" | 1891 
| style="text-align: center;" | 1902
|  Christopher Barlow
| Bishop of Goulburn (1902–1915)

|- valign="top" style="background-color: #F7F0F2;"
| style="text-align: center;" | 
| style="text-align: center;" | 1902 
| style="text-align: center;" | 1913
|  George Frodsham
|
|- valign="top" style="background-color: white;"
| style="text-align: center;" | 
| style="text-align: center;" | 1913
| style="text-align: center;" | 1947
|  John Feetham
| later canonised as St John Oliver Feetham

|- valign="top" style="background-color: #F7F0F2;"
| style="text-align: center;" | 
| style="text-align: center;" | 1947
| style="text-align: center;" | 1952
|  Wilfrid Belcher
|
|- valign="top" style="background-color: white;"
| style="text-align: center;" | 
| style="text-align: center;" | 1953
| style="text-align: center;" | 1970
|  Ian Shevill
| Afterwards Bishop of Newcastle

|- valign="top" style="background-color: #F7F0F2;"
| style="text-align: center;" | 
| style="text-align: center;" | 1971
| style="text-align: center;" | 1996
|  John Lewis
| Previously with the Society of the Sacred Mission

|- valign="top" style="background-color: white;"
| style="text-align: center;" | 
| style="text-align: center;" | 1996
| style="text-align: center;" | 2002
|  Clyde Wood
| previously Bishop of the Northern Territory

|- valign="top" style="background-color: #F7F0F2;"
| style="text-align: center;" | 
| style="text-align: center;" | 2002 
| style="text-align: center;" | 2007
|  John Noble
|
|- valign="top" style="background-color: white;"
| style="text-align: center;" | 
| style="text-align: center;" | 2007 
| style="text-align: center;" | 2018
|  Bill Ray
|
|- valign="top" style="background-color: #F7F0F2;"
| style="text-align: center;" | 
| style="text-align: center;" | 2019 
| style="text-align: center;" | present
|  Keith Joseph
| Previously Dean of Darwin
|}

References 

 
 F. L. Cross, ed., The Oxford Dictionary of the Christian Church (Oxford University Press, 1957)
External links

 – official site

 
North Queensland
Australia religion-related lists